B2A may refer to:

 Business-to-government (business-to-administration)
 Haplogroup B2a, a subtype of Haplogroup B (mtDNA)
 B2A (BRT), a bus route in Guangzhou
 B2A class, traditional motorcycles with sidecars in sidecar racing for the Sidecar World Championship
 Brantly B-2A light helicopter
 Northrop-Grumman B-2A Spirit stealth bomber

See also

 2BA
 BA2 (disambiguation)
 BAA (disambiguation)
 BBA (disambiguation)
 BA (disambiguation)